Federal Highway 44 ( La Carretera Federal 44 ) (Fed. 44) is a free (libre) part of the federal highways corridors (los corredores carreteros federales) of Mexico.

References

044
Transportation in Zacatecas